Emmanuel Mission Senior Secondary School is a co-educational English-medium high school located in Jaisalmer, a town in the state of Rajasthan, India. The school is affiliated to the Central Board of Secondary Education (CBSE).

History
The school was established by Father M. A. Thomas and his wife Mrs Sosamma Samuel in the border town of Jaisalmer in the year 1984 with motive to impart quality education. The school was started in a small rented space in the city and was shifted to its present location in the year 1990. The school was initially affiliated to Board of Secondary Education, Rajasthan but in the year 2008 the school got affiliated to Central Board of Secondary Education, Delhi.
The school belongs to Emmanuel Society.

Meaning
Emmanuel (Immanuel) is a Hebrew word meaning "God is with us".

Infrastructure
The school is equipped with excellent infrastructure. The classrooms are well furnished, ventilated and with provision for natural lighting. The computer lab provide students with hands on experience with computer programming. The school also has a Library cum reading room. Apart from this the school has playground, basketball court and other sports facilities which contribute to the overall development of students.

Primary schools in India
High schools and secondary schools in Rajasthan
Christian schools in Rajasthan
Jaisalmer district
Educational institutions established in 1984
1984 establishments in Rajasthan